API Equality – Northern California is an American social justice advocacy non-profit whose mission is to build the power and increase the visibility of the lesbian, gay, bisexual, transgender, and queer Asian Pacific Islander (LGBTQ API) community.

The organization was founded in 2004 in response to a large rally against same-sex marriage organized by the Chinese Christian community in the San Francisco Bay Area. It organized the first ever contingent in support of same-sex marriage to appear in San Francisco’s Chinese New Year Parade and was a founding member of the campaign against California’s anti-same-sex marriage ballot initiative, Proposition 8.

Its current programming includes its LGBTQ API leadership development program and the Dragon Fruit Project.

History 
On April 25, 2004, a largely Asian American and Christian crowd of more than 7,000, organized by Chinese Christian leaders, rallied in San Francisco to protest the legalization of same-sex marriage.

API Equality – Northern California was founded in 2004 in response to this rally to provide a voice from the API community in support of same-sex marriage. At its inception, it was called “Asian Equality” and was a national ad hoc coalition of API individuals and organizations that advocated for same-sex marriage. API Equality – Northern California has since evolved into a multi-issue organization working for equality and justice in Northern California and in the state’s API and LGBTQ communities.

API Equality – Northern California is fiscally sponsored by Chinese for Affirmative Action, an API civil rights organization based in Northern California that advances social justice for the Chinese and API communities.

API Equality – Northern California now includes Monna Wong (Executive Director), Tracy Nguyen (Program Coordinator), and Sammie Wills (Program Assistant).

Accomplishments 
 2005: Organized the first contingent in support of same-sex marriage in the San Francisco Chinese New Year parade, which is the largest Asian cultural event in North America and reaches millions of spectators in the San Francisco Bay Area and across the world.
 2007: With sister organization API Equality – LA,  spearheaded the development of an Asian American amicus brief signed by over 63 local, state, and national API organizations in support of the California same-sex marriage cases.
 2007: Was a founding member of both the Let California Ring and Equality for All/No on Prop 8 Campaigns.
 2010: Launched ongoing intensive summer internship program to develop the next generation of LGBTQ API social justice and cultural change leaders.
 2011: Organized the first queer and Asian flash mob in the heart of San Francisco’s Chinatown with over 100 participants.
 2012: Conducted first-of-its-kind qualitative research in Filipino communities on LGBTQ issues and people.
 2012 to Present: Launched Dragon Fruit Project with Amy Sueyoshi, Associate Dean of the College of Ethnic Studies at San Francisco State University. The Dragon Fruit Project is an intergenerational oral history project that explores LGBTQ API people and their experiences with love and activism in the 1960s-1990s. Interviews and documents from the Dragon Fruit Project have been on exhibit at the GLBT History Museum in San Francisco since 2014.

References

External links
 http://www.apiequalitync.org

Non-profit organizations based in San Francisco
LGBT organizations in the United States
2004 establishments in California